The province of Highland Papua (Provinsi Papua Pegunungan) in Indonesia is divided into eight kabupaten (regencies) which in turn are divided administratively into districts, known as distrik under the law of 2001 on "special autonomy for Papua province".

List
The districts of Highland Papua and their respective regencies are as follows (as of July 2022). Administrative villages (desa in rural areas and keluhuran in urban areas) are also listed for each district.

See also
List of districts of Central Papua
List of districts of South Papua
List of districts of West Papua

References

 
Highland Papua